John Wesley Crockett (July 10, 1807 – November 24, 1852), was an American politician who represented Tennessee's Twelfth Congressional District in the United States House of Representatives. It was the same district his father, David Crockett, had represented earlier.

Biography
Crockett was born in East Tennessee on July 10, 1807 to David (Davy) Crockett (August 17, 1786 – March 6, 1836) and his first wife, Mary (Polly) Finley (1788–1815). He had one brother named William Finley Crockett and one sister named Margaret Finley (Polly) Crockett. He was educated in the public schools, studied law, and then was admitted to the bar. He began his law practice in Paris, Tennessee. He married Martha Hamilton and they had fourteen children.

Career

Crockett held numerous local and state offices before being elected as a Whig to the Twenty-fifth and Twenty-sixth Congresses; he succeeded Adam Huntsman, the man who had defeated his father in the 1835 election. He served from March 4, 1837 to March 3, 1841.  Crockett was next elected by the Tennessee General Assembly to be the attorney general for the ninth district of Tennessee, and served from 1841 to 1843.

In 1843, Crockett moved to New Orleans and became a commission merchant. He was also a newspaper editor, publishing the National from May 22, 1848 and establishing the Crescent around 1847.

Death
After moving to Memphis, Tennessee, Crockett died there the same year on November 24, 1852 at age 45. He is interred at Old City Cemetery in Paris, Tennessee.

Crockett family tree

References

External links

1807 births
1852 deaths
Davy Crockett
Whig Party members of the United States House of Representatives from Tennessee
19th-century American politicians
19th-century American newspaper editors
19th-century American lawyers
Tennessee lawyers
Editors of Louisiana newspapers
Journalists from Tennessee